Sanjay Chauhan (1962 – 12 January 2023) was an Indian screenwriter in Hindi cinema, most known for I Am Kalam (2011) for which he won the Filmfare Award for Best Story., and Paan Singh Tomar  (2012), which he co-wrote with Tigmanshu Dhulia

Biography
Born and brought up Bhopal, where his father worked for the Indian Railways, while his mother was a school teacher, Chauhan started his career as a journalist in Delhi, before moving to Mumbai after he wrote crime TV series, Bhanwar for Sony TV in late 1990s.

Chauhan died of liver disease on 12 January 2023, at the age of 60.

Filmography
 Hazaaron Khwaishein Aisi (2003) (Dialogue)
 Dhoop (2003) (Dialogue)
  Siskiyaan (2005) (Screenplay)
 Say Salaam India (2007) (Dialogue)
 Maine Gandhi Ko Nahin Mara (2005) (Screenplay & Dialogue)
 Right Yaaa Wrong (2010) (Dialogue)
 I Am Kalam (2011) (Story and Dialogue)
 Saheb, Biwi Aur Gangster (2011) (Story & Screenplay)
 Paan Singh Tomar (2012) (Story & Screenplay) 
 Saheb, Biwi Aur Gangster Returns (2013) (Story & Screenplay)

References

External links
 

1962 births
2023 deaths 
Deaths from liver disease
Indian male screenwriters
Writers from Bhopal
Filmfare Awards winners
Hindi screenwriters
Screenwriters from Madhya Pradesh
21st-century Indian dramatists and playwrights
21st-century Indian male writers
21st-century Indian screenwriters